Cormac Murphy (born 21 April 1993) is an Irish hurler who plays for Cork Premier Championship club Mallow and at inter-county level with the Cork senior hurling team. He currently plays as a right wing-forward, but can also be deployed as a wing-back.

Playing career

University College Cork

During his studies at University College Cork, Murphy was selected for the college's senior hurling team on a number of occasions. On 2 March 2013, he was an unused substitute when the university defeated Mary Immaculate College by 2-17 to 2-12 to win the Fitzgibbon Cup.

Mallow

Murphy joined the Mallow club at a young age and played in all grades at juvenile and underage levels, enjoying championship success in under-14 and under-16 grades. He later won North Cork Under-21 Championship medals as a hurler in 2013 and as a Gaelic footballer in 2014.

Cork

Minor and under-21

Murphy made his only appearance for the Cork minor hurling team on 27 April 2011 in a 2-14 to 0-12 Munster Championship defeat by Limerick.

On 6 June 2012, Murphy made his first appearance for the Cork under-21 team in a one-point defeat by Tipperary in the Munster Championship. His three seasons in this grade also ended without silverware.

Intermediate

After lining out for the Cork senior team in the early part of 2014, Murphy was also added to the Cork intermediate team and made his first appearance in a 1-21 to 3-09 Munster Championship defeat of Waterford on 25 May. He later won a Munster Championship medal on 25 June after a 4-15 to 2-08 defeat of Tipperary in the final.

On 28 July 2018, Murphy scored three points from centre-forward in Cork's 2-19 to 0-18 All-Ireland final defeat of Wexford.

Senior

Murphy was added to the extended training panel of the Cork senior team just before the start of the 2014 Munster Championship. He made his first appearance for the team on 14 February 2015 in a 1-22 to 2-17 National Hurling League defeat by Kilkenny. On 3 May, Murphy was at left wing-back for Cork's 1-24 to 0-17 defeat by Waterford in the National League final. He made his first championship start in a 3-19 to 1-21 Munster Championship defeat by Waterford on 7 June. Murphy was dropped from the Cork panel prior to the start of the 2017 Munster Championship.

In November 2018, Murphy was recalled to the Cork senior panel.

Career statistics

Inter-county

Honours

University College Cork
Fitzgibbon Cup (1): 2013

Mallow
North Cork Under-21 Football Championship (1): 2014
North Cork Under-21 Hurling Championship (1): 2013

Cork
All-Ireland Intermediate Hurling Championship (1): 2018
Munster Intermediate Hurling Championship (1): 2014

References

External links
Cormac Murphy profile at the Cork GAA website

1993 births
Living people
Mallow hurlers
Mallow Gaelic footballers
UCC hurlers
Cork inter-county hurlers